Dragoneutes pilosus is a species of beetle in the family Cerambycidae. It was described by Monne in 2004.

Physical Appearance 
The Dragoneutes Pilosus has a thinner body than most Beetles, yet you would find it closer to a cockroach than one. The Beetle has two antennas that lean on the body, instead of standing up. The body of the Dragoneutes Pilosus has 3 legs, and a brown to dark orange skin color.

References

Torneutini
Beetles described in 2004